

Events
January 2 - Police in India arrest singer and instrumentalist Ghazal Srinivas following claims of sexual harassment by an employee of his radio station. 
January 4 - It is reported that British singer Jessie J will be among the competitors in the new season of Chinese talent show The Singer 2018, to be broadcast on Hunan TV.
January 16 - Chinese fans and musicians pay tribute to Dolores O'Riordan, lead singer of The Cranberries, who performed in China in 2011.
January 21 - The Voice of Mongolia talent contest is launched on Mongol TV, and is eventually won by Enguun.
March 2 – The 14th Jakarta International Java Jazz Festival opens in Jakarta, Indonesia, lasting until 4 March.
March 25 – Sinta Wullur’s Tagore’s Fireflies is premièred at Symphony Hall, Birmingham, during the Debussy Festival.
April – Indonesian actress and singer Maudy Ayunda releases a volume of autobiography in English, titled Dear Tomorrow.
August – Armand Maulana, Anggun and Titi DJ are announced as judges for Season 3 of The Voice Indonesia, along with singers Vidi Aldiano and :id:Anindyo Baskoro as joint coaches.

Albums
Arkona -Khram (January 19)
Band-Maid - World Domination (February 14)
Gugudan - Act. 4 Cait Sith (February 1)
Koda Kumi 
And (February 28)
DNA (August 22)
Kyary Pamyu Pamyu - Japamyu (September 26)
Morning Musume - Hatachi no Morning Musume (February 7)
Seungri - The Great Seungri (July 20)

Classical
Bishnu Priya - The Good Immigrant
Alexander Rahbari - My Mother Persia

Opera
Toshio Hosokawa and Marcel Beyer – Erdbeben.Träume.
 Gity Razaz – Fault Lines

Musical films
7 Din Mohabbat In (Pakistan)
Amma I Love You (India)
Bhaijaan Elo Re (India) 
Brihaspathi (India)
Fanney Khan (India)
Happy Phirr Bhag Jayegi (India)
Inspector Notty K (Bangladesh)
Jaane Kyun De Yaaron (India)
Kids on the Slope (Japan)
Manto (India - Urdu)
Noor Jahaan (Bangladesh)
Ang Panahon ng Halimaw (Philippines)
Super Hero (film) (Bangladesh)
Teefa in Trouble (Pakistan)
TokiRes the Movie: MIRACLE6 (Japan)

Deaths
January 3 - Medeniyet Shahberdiyeva, Turkmen opera singer and music educator, 87
January 15 - Sujud Sutrisno, 64, Indonesian street drummer and singer, 64
January 16 - Shammi Akhtar, Bangladeshi playback singer, 60 (breast cancer)
January 22 - Ceylon Manohar, Indian actor and playback singer, 73
January 25 - Sabar Koti, Indian singer, 58
January 31 - Hwang Byungki, South Korean gayageum player, 81
February 5 - Jockie Soerjoprajogo, 63, Indonesian musician and songwriter
March 1 - Arabinda Muduli, 56, Indian musician and singer
May 2 - Vadim Mulerman, 79, Soviet singer
May 4 - Abi Ofarim, 80, Israeli singer and dancer
May 6 
Arun Date, 84, Indian singer
Gurukrushna Goswami, 84, Indian lyricist
May 16 - Hideki Saijo, 63, Japanese singer (heart failure)
July 30 - Khayyam Mirzazade, 82, Azerbaijani composer and academic
August 1 - Umbayee, 66, Indian ghazal singer (cancer)
August 5 - Ellen Joyce Loo, 32, Canadian-born Hong Kong singer (fall)
September 19 - Buren Bayaer, 58, Chinese singer and journalist (heart attack)
October 2 - Balabhaskar, 40, Indian violinist, composer and record producer (cardiac arrest)
October 9 - Nitin Bali, 47, Indian singer (traffic collision)
October 13 - Annapurna Devi, 91, Indian classical musician
October 14
Aziza Niyozmetova, 46, Uzbekistani singer
, 57, Malaysian singer (traffic collision)
October 16 - Du Yuwei, 19, Chinese singer (suicide)
October 18 - Ayub Bachchu, 56, Bangladeshi singer-songwriter
October 30
Rico J. Puno, 65, Filipino pop singer (heart failure)
Yashwant Dev, 91, Indian poet and composer
November 14 - Masahiro Sayama, 64, Japanese pianist.
November 22 - Imrat Khan, 83, Indian sitar player
November 27 - Mohammed Aziz, 64, Indian playback singer (heart attack)
December 22 - Indonesian musicians killed in the Sunda Strait tsunami:
Windu Andi Darmawan, drummer (Seventeen).
Muhammad Awal Purbani, bassist (Seventeen).
Herman Sikumbang, 36, guitarist (Seventeen).

By country 
 2018 in Chinese music
 2018 in Japanese music
 2018 in Philippine music
 2018 in South Korean music

See also 
 2018 in music

References 

Asia
Asian music
2018 in Asia